Ana Beatriz Moser (born 14 August 1968 in Blumenau) is a Brazilian former volleyball player, who played as an outside hitter.

She was a member of the Women's National Team for over a decade, serving as the team captain and winning the squad's first Olympic Games medal at the 1996 Summer Olympics. She participated at the 1999 FIVB Volleyball Women's World Cup, helping Brazil qualify for the 2000 Summer Olympics, afterwards announcing she was retiring from the sport.

After retirement, Moser helped various sports-related social projects. In 2022, she was announced to become the Minister of Sports in the incoming government of Luiz Inácio Lula da Silva.

Clubs
 Transbrasil (1985–1988)
 Sadia Esporte Clube (1988–1991)
 Colgate/São Caetano (1991–1993)
 Leite Moça/Sorocaba (1993–1996)
 Mizuno/Uniban (1996–1997)
 Dayvit/Barueri (1997–1998)
 UNG (1998–1999)
 BCN/Osasco (1998–1999)

Awards

Individuals
 1987 FIVB U20 World Championship – "Most Valuable Player"
 1990 FIVB World Championship – "Best Spiker"
 1990–91 Brazilian Superliga – "Best Spiker" 
 1991 South American Championship – "Most Valuable Player"
 1991 South American Championship – "Best Spiker"
 1992 Summer Olympics – "Best Server"
 1994 FIVB Club World Championship – "Most Valuable Player"
 1994 FIVB Club World Championship – "Best Server"
 1995 FIVB World Grand Prix – "Best Server"
 1995–96 Brazilian Superliga – "Best Scorer" 
 1996–97 Brazilian Superliga – "Best Scorer"

References

1968 births
Living people
Brazilian women's volleyball players
Olympic volleyball players of Brazil
Volleyball players at the 1988 Summer Olympics
Volleyball players at the 1992 Summer Olympics
Volleyball players at the 1996 Summer Olympics
Olympic bronze medalists for Brazil
People from Blumenau
Olympic medalists in volleyball
Medalists at the 1996 Summer Olympics
Pan American Games silver medalists for Brazil
Pan American Games medalists in volleyball
Wing spikers
Volleyball players at the 1991 Pan American Games
Medalists at the 1991 Pan American Games
Sportspeople from Santa Catarina (state)
Women government ministers of Brazil
Sports ministers of Brazil